Kurukshetra is a 1945 Indian Hindi-language film directed by Rameshwar Sharma. Produced Under the banner of Unity Pictures it starred K. L. Saigal as Karna, P. V. Narasimha Bharathi as Krishna, Radharani, Nawab, Shanti, Biman Bannerji and Shamli and had music composed by Ganpatrao. The film was cited as an offbeat film of K. L. Saigal, directed by a relatively unknown director; it's stated to be a "forerunner" to later Art Cinema. It was also the on-screen debut for actor Ajit Khan.

Cast
 K. L. Saigal as Karna
 Nawab Kashmiri as Yudhisthira
 P. V. Narasimha Bharathi as Krishna
 D. Balasubramaniam as Duryodhanan
 Kashmiri as Draupadi
 Shamli as Padmavati
 Udwadia as Bhanumati
 Shanti as Kunti
 Radharani
 Ajit Khan

Reception

Soundtrack
The lyrics were written by Jameel Mazhari while the singers were Saigal, Radharani, Satya Choudhary and Kalyani Das.

The music director was Pandit Ganpat Rao who was a classical musician and had trained under Abdul Karim Khan; the only other film he composed music for was Bebus (1950) where he was co-credited with S. K. Pal. The lyrics were written by Jameel Mazhari while the singers were Saigal, Radharani, Satya Choudhary and Kalyani Das.

Song List

References

External links

1945 films
1940s Hindi-language films
Indian black-and-white films